Pennada Agraharam is a neighbourhood and a railway station on the Bhimavaram-Narasapur branch railway. The Pennada Railway station has a double track railway line. The village is located on National Highway 214 between Bhimavaram and Palakollu.

Demographics 

 Census of India, Pennada Agraharam had a population of 5603. The total population constitute, 2809 males and 2794 females with a sex ratio of 995 females per 1000 males. 534 children are in the age group of 0–6 years, with sex ratio of 861 The average literacy rate stands at 81.30%.

References 

Villages in West Godavari district